Eduardo Propper de Callejón (Madrid, 9 April 1895 – London, 11 January 1972) was a Spanish diplomat who is remembered mainly for having facilitated the escape of thousands of Jews from Occupied France during World War II between 1940 and 1944.

He was the father-in-law of the British banker Raymond Bonham Carter and the maternal grandfather of the British actress Helena Bonham Carter.

Career
Propper de Callejón was First Secretary of the Spanish Embassy in Paris when France surrendered to Nazi Germany on 20 June 1940. To prevent the Wehrmacht from plundering the art collection that his wife's family kept at the Château de Royaumont, he declared the castle to be his main residence so that it would be treated in the same privileged way as the accommodation of any other diplomat. Among the art works thus saved are a triptych of Van Eyck (one of Adolf Hitler's favourite painters).

In July 1940, he issued from the Spanish Consulate in Bordeaux, in co-operation with Portuguese Consul Aristides de Sousa Mendes, more than 30,000 transit visas to Jews so that they could cross Spain to reach Portugal. When Spanish Foreign Minister Ramón Serrano Suñer learnt that Propper de Callejón was issuing visas without prior authorization, he had him transferred to the Consulate of Larache in the Spanish protectorate in Morocco. Afterwards, he would be posted to Rabat; Zurich; Washington, DC; Ottawa; and Oslo.

Family
Propper de Callejón's father, Maximilian "Max" Propper, was a Bohemian Jew, and his mother, Juana de Callejón, was a Spanish Catholic. They raised him as well as his brothers in the Catholic faith. His wife, Baroness Hélène Fould-Springer, was a socialite and painter. She was from a notable Jewish Franco-Austrian banking family, the daughter of Baron Eugène Fould-Springer (a French banker descended from the Ephrussi family and the Fould dynasty) and Marie Cecile von Springer (whose father was Austrian-born industrialist Baron Gustav von Springer and whose mother was from the de Königswarter family). She converted to Catholicism after the war. Her sister was the prominent Paris art patron and philanthropist Liliane de Rothschild (Baroness Élie de Rothschild, 1916–2003) of the prominent Rothschild family (who had also married within the von Springer family in the 19th century).

Legacy
He never gained public recognition for his heroic acts before his death in 1972 in London after an operation.

In 2007, he was officially recognised as a Righteous Among the Nations by Yad Vashem, the Holocaust remembrance authority in Israel. That was accomplished by the testimony of Austrian Archduke Otto von Habsburg, who had disclosed his knowledge of Propper de Callejón's actions at the Nazi occupation of France during an interview with Felix Pfeifle for the film Felix Austria (2012).

See also
Francoist Spain and the Holocaust

References

External links
 
 

1895 births
1972 deaths
Spanish diplomats
Spanish people of Jewish descent
Spanish people of Czech descent
Spanish Roman Catholics
Spanish Righteous Among the Nations
Catholic Righteous Among the Nations
Fould family
Spanish expatriates in France